Moritz Jenz (born 30 April 1999) is a German professional footballer who plays as a centre-back for Bundesliga club Schalke 04, on loan from Ligue 1 club Lorient.

Career

Early career 
Jenz joined English side Fulham in July 2015 after being scouted playing for Tennis Borussia Berlin.

Lausanne-Sport 
On 25 August 2020, Jenz joined newly-promoted Swiss Super League side Lausanne-Sport on a permanent deal.   The following month, he made his professional debut, coming on as a late substitute in a 2–1 win over Servette.

Lorient 
On 30 August 2021, Jenz signed a five-year deal with Ligue 1 side Lorient.

Celtic (loan) 
On 19 July 2022, Jenz joined Scottish Premiership side Celtic on a season-long loan, with the club having the option of making the move permanent. This seen Jenz reunited with his former Fulham teammate Matt O'Riley. The following month, Jenz scored on his league debut at Ross County On 6 September 2022, Jenz made his UEFA Champions League debut in a 3-0 home defeat against Real Madrid.

In an interview with German website Transfermarkt, Jenz spoke of his admiration for Celtic with him quoted as saying (in German): “Celtic is old school, Celtic is mysterious, Celtic is pure football and above all Celtic is a religion. When you stand at a home game, close your eyes and get goosebumps just from the chants, you know why this club fascinates the world”. Popular with Celtic fans, he is often called by his nickname “Mercedes Jenz”. Although Jenz expressed his desire to remain at Celtic beyond his loan spell - it would later be terminated in January after lack of playing opportunities from November onwards due to the winter arrival of Yuki Kobayashi and regular starting centreback Carl Starfelt returning from injury.

Schalke 04 (loan) 
On 26 January 2023, Jenz joined Bundesliga club Schalke 04 on loan until the end of the season, with the move becoming permanent if his new club avoid relegation in the 2022–23 season. Three days later, he made his debut for the club in a 0–0 draw against 1. FC Köln.

Personal life
Jenz was born in Germany to a Nigerian father and German mother.

Career statistics

References

External links
 
 

Living people
1999 births
Footballers from Berlin
German footballers
German sportspeople of Nigerian descent
Association football defenders
FC Lausanne-Sport players
Fulham F.C. players
FC Lorient players
Celtic F.C. players
FC Schalke 04 players
Swiss Super League players
Ligue 1 players
Scottish Professional Football League players
Bundesliga players
German expatriate footballers
German expatriate sportspeople in England
German expatriate sportspeople in Switzerland
German expatriate sportspeople in France
German expatriate sportspeople in Scotland
Expatriate footballers in England
Expatriate footballers in Switzerland
Expatriate footballers in France
Expatriate footballers in Scotland